Brenderup Folk High School is a small Danish folk high school in Brenderup, a village of Brenderup Sogn in Middelfart Municipality, Region of Southern Denmark. The school was founded in 1986, as a part of what was then known as the international peace movement. Today the school is focused mainly on international bonding.

External links 
Brenderup Højskole Web site

Secondary schools in Denmark
Educational institutions established in 1986
1986 establishments in Denmark
Folk high schools in Denmark